Behren Morton (born January 17, 2002) is an American football quarterback who currently plays for the Texas Tech Red Raiders.

Early life and high school
Morton grew up in Eastland, Texas and attended Eastland High School, where his father is the head football coach. He became the starting quarterback for the Mavericks as a freshman. Morton was named the MVP of District 5-3A after he passed for 2,435 yards and 18 touchdowns with four interceptions and rushed for 146 yards and four touchdowns. He repeated as the District 5-3A MVP in his junior season after passing for 2,766 yards and 29 touchdowns. As a senior, Morton passed for 3,613 yards with 37 touchdowns against six interceptions and also rushed for 893 yards and 19 touchdowns and was named the District 5-3A MVP for a third straight season. Morton was rated a four-star recruit and committed to play college football at Texas Tech over offers from Baylor, SMU, TCU, and Texas A&M.

College career
Morton played in two games as a true freshman before redshirting the season. He entered his redshirt freshman season as the Red Raiders' third-string quarterback behind starter Tyler Shough and Donovan Smith. Morton saw playing time in four of the teams first five games before being named Texas Tech's starting quarterback after both Shough and Smith suffered injuries. He completed 39 of 62 passes for 379 yards and two touchdowns with one interception and rushed 16 times for 46 yards and one touchdown in his first career start, a 41-31 loss to seventh-ranked Oklahoma State. Morton started the team's following game against West Virginia. He finished the game with 325 passing yards and two touchdowns in the 48–10 win and was named the Big 12 Newcomer of the Week.

Statistics

References

External links
Texas Tech Red Raiders profile

Living people
Players of American football from Texas
American football quarterbacks
Texas Tech Red Raiders football players
Year of birth missing (living people)